"Our A-Story Is a 'D' Story" is the sixth episode of the first season of American animated television series BoJack Horseman. It was written by Scott Marder and directed by J. C. Gonzalez. The episode was released in the United States, along with the rest of season one, via Netflix on August 22, 2014. Yvette Nicole Brown, Chris Parnell, and Horatio Sanz provide voices in guest roles in the episode.

Plot 
BoJack becomes jealous of Mr. Peanutbutter's relationship with Diane, and while drunk, steals the "D" in the Hollywood Sign, trying to impress Diane. Later, BoJack and Mr. Peanutbutter plan to return the missing letter, but find that the town has adapted and now goes by the name . Meanwhile, Todd is in jail after an arrest for the David Boreanaz scam, and is courted by two rival prison gangs.

References

External links 
 "Our A-Story Is a 'D' Story" on Netflix
 

2014 American television episodes
BoJack Horseman episodes